There are a number of higher education institutions in Karachi, Sindh, Pakistan. These include  universities supported by the federal government of Pakistan and the provincial government of Sindh. There are also several private universities supported by various bodies and societies. The Higher Education Commission of Pakistan maintains a list of recognized universities.

List

Other institutions
APIIT (Asia Pacific Institute of Information Technology)
COMMECS Institute of Business and Emerging Sciences
Dar-ul-Uloom, Amjadia (ur)
Dar-ul-Uloom, Karachi
Fatima Jinnah Dental College
Institute of Industrial Electronics Engineering (PCSIR)
Karachi School of Art
National Institute of Management, Karachi
Pakistan Institute of Management
Usman Institute of Technology
Aleemiyah Institute of Islamic Studies
Aligarh Institute of Technology
Jamia Binoria
Jamia Tur Rasheed, Karachi
Jamia Uloom-ul-Islamia
Salim Habib University
Shaheed Benazir Bhutto City University
Shaheed Benazir Bhutto Dewan University

See also
Higher Education Commission of Pakistan
List of colleges in Karachi
List of universities in Pakistan

References

External links

Universities
Karachi
Karachi